Propyl propanoate (propyl propionate) is the organic compound with the molecular formula C6H12O2.  It is the ester of propanol and propionic acid. Like most esters, propyl propanoate is a colorless liquid with a fruity odor.  The scent of propyl propionate is described as a chemically tinged pineapple or pear. It is used in perfumery and as a solvent. The refractive index at 20 °C is  1.393.

Because n-propyl propionate is a low-odor, moderately volatile, non-HAP ester solvent with good solvent activity and versatility, it is considered a safer substitute for toluene.

References

Propionate esters
Propyl esters